Mississippi Highway 30 (MS 30) is a state highway that runs across the North Central Hills of the Appalachian Mountains in northeast Mississippi.

Route description

MS 30 begins in Lafayette County in Oxford at an interchange with MS 7 in the northern part of town. It heads east briefly as a four-lane divided highway through a business district before narrowing to two-lanes and passing through neighborhoods for several blocks. The highway now leaves Oxford and passes through farmland for a couple miles before entering the Holly Springs National Forest, where it travels through remote woodlands (passing by Puskus Lake Recreation Area) as it crosses into Union County.

MS 30 exits the National Forest and travels eastward through farmland for several miles, where it passes through Etta (where it has an intersection with MS 355 and crosses the Tallahatchie River), before having an intersection with MS 349 and passing through the communities of Enterprise and Poolville. The highway enters the New Albany city limits and passes through an industrial area  before some neighborhoods and business district at an interchange with I-22/US 78 (Exit 61), where MS 30 becomes concurrent (overlapped) with  the Interstate. MS 30 heads east along four-lane I-22/US 78 east for a few miles to cross the Tallahatchie River for a second time immediately before Exit 63 (Carter Avenue/Central Avenue/Bratton Road; signed as Downtown New Albany). The freeway now reaches Exit 64, where MS 30 splits off and follows four-lane MS 15 north through the eastern side of town, where they have intersections with both MS 178 and MS 348, before MS 30 splits off and heads east through neighborhoods as a two-lane. MS 30 leaves New Albany and travels northeast through wooded and hilly terrain for the next several miles as it passes through Keownville, Pleasant Ridge (where it has an intersection with MS 370), and Graham (where it has an intersection with MS 9) before crossing into Prentiss County.

MS 30 passes through Geeville as it travels through farmland for a few miles to an interchange with US 45 in Wheeler, which MS 30 becomes concurrent with and they head north as a four-lane expressway for several miles to Booneville, where MS 30 splits off and heads east along a two-lane expressway on the southern outskirts of town, having an interchanges with MS 145 and MS 4, as well as having an intersection with MS 364 before leaving the Booneville area and winding its way through hilly woodlands for the next several miles, where it has an intersection with MS 365 in Burton before entering Tishomingo County.

MS 30 travels through more hilly woodlands to cross the Tennessee Tombigbee Waterway and pass through Paden before having an intersection with MS 25 in the northern part of the town of Tishomingo. The highway passes through more hilly for a few more miles before coming to an end at an interchange with the Natchez Trace Parkway at the community of Mingo, with the road continuing south as County Road 85 (CR 85) towards Bloody Springs and the Alabama state line.

Major intersections

See also

References

External links

030
Transportation in Lafayette County, Mississippi
Transportation in Union County, Mississippi
Transportation in Prentiss County, Mississippi
Transportation in Tishomingo County, Mississippi